James Andrew Cumming (born 4 September 1999) is an English professional footballer who plays as a goalkeeper for EFL League One club Milton Keynes Dons, on loan from Premier League club Chelsea.

Club career

Chelsea
Cumming joined Chelsea at the age of eight, enrolling in the club's development programme. He progressed through the various age groups at Chelsea and became the under-17 team's first-choice goalkeeper at the start of the 2017–18 season. That season, he played twice for the club's under-21 team in the EFL Trophy, making his debut in a 2–2 draw away to Plymouth Argyle on 15 August 2017. Cumming also featured regularly for the club's under-19 team that season; saving three penalties in the club's UEFA Youth League semi-final penalty shoot-out victory over Porto on 20 April 2018. He signed a professional contract with Chelsea in November 2018, keeping him contracted to the club until the end of the 2020–21 season. Cumming played eleven times for the under-21 team in EFL Trophy matches over the next three seasons. Cumming was named on the substitute's bench for Chelsea's 4–1 UEFA Europa League Final victory over Arsenal in Baku on 29 May 2019.

Loan to Stevenage
Having not made any first-team appearances for Chelsea, Cumming joined League Two club Stevenage on a season-long loan agreement on 17 August 2020. He made his professional debut for Stevenage in a 3–3 draw with Portsmouth in the EFL Cup on 29 August 2020. The match went to a penalty shoot-out, which Stevenage lost 3–1. He made his league debut for the club in a 1–1 draw against Barrow on 12 September 2020. Cumming made 47 appearances in all competitions for the Hertfordshire club during the 2020–21 season, registering 18 clean sheets, as Stevenage ended the season with the third best defensive record in League Two.

Loan to Gillingham
Cumming signed for League One club Gillingham on a season-long loan on 26 July 2021. He debuted for Gillingham in the club's 1–1 home draw with Lincoln City on the opening day of the 2021–22 season. Having made 22 appearances during the first half of the season, Cumming was recalled from his loan by Chelsea on 13 January 2022.

Loan to Milton Keynes Dons
On the same day as his loan recall was officially announced, Cumming joined another League One club, Milton Keynes Dons, for the remainder   of the 2021–22 season. He made his debut on 15 January 2022, in a 2–1 away victory against Portsmouth. Cumming made 23 appearances for Milton Keynes Dons during the season, keeping 10 clean sheets as MK Dons finished the season in third place in League One. He returned to MK Dons for a second loan spell on 9 July 2022, with the loan agreement running for the 2022–23 season.

International career
Cumming was called up to represent the England under-17 team for the 2016 UEFA European under-17 Championship Elite qualifying round matches in March 2016. He played in the last two group matches as England qualified for the final tournament. He also earned one cap for the England under-19 team, playing in a 2–0 defeat to Macedonia in a UEFA European under-19 qualifying match on 27 March 2018.

Career statistics

Honours
Chelsea
UEFA Europa League: 2018–19

References

External links

1999 births
Living people
English footballers
England youth international footballers
Association football goalkeepers
Chelsea F.C. players
Stevenage F.C. players
Gillingham F.C. players
Milton Keynes Dons F.C. players
English Football League players